Jake Eccleston (born ) is an English professional rugby league footballer who last played for the Rochdale Hornets in the Kingstone Press Championship. He plays as a wing, centre or fullback.

Eccleston made his professional début for Halifax in 2015 and spent two years there before departing for Rochdale Hornets at the end of the 2016 season.

References

External links
Halifax profile
Scoresway profile

Living people
1995 births
Rugby league wingers
Rugby league centres
Halifax R.L.F.C. players